Pocket Protectors was an animated series produced for New Zealand's long running children's show, What Now?. The series is when Ollie is given a pocket protector full of old fashioned stationery by his Dad, the last thing he expected was for them to transform into tiny robots, known as the Pocket Protectors, intent on guiding Ollie through "tough times". The only problem is... the Pocket Protectors make Ollie's life more difficult than it already was... thanks to them being completely delusional.

Pocket Protectors is now broadcast in Australia on 7TWO as well as ABC3.

Voices
Ryan Cooper - Ballpoint, Straight Edge, Erazer, Radius
Vaughan Smith - Grubb 
Rose Matafeo - Sam
Jason Faáfoi - Tony
Melanie Tonello - Sky 
Ryan Inglis - Ollie

Episode list

1. Lola's Theme - Part 1

2. Lola's Theme - Part 2

3. I Am Iggy Hear Me Squeak - Part 1

4. I Am Iggy Hear Me Squeak - Part 2

5. Fast & the Fuzziest - Part 1

6. Fast & the Fuzziest - Part 2

7. The Yeoldefacescroll Blues - Part 1

8. The Yeoldefacescroll Blues - Part 2

9. The Final Flush - Part 1

10. The Final Flush - Part 2

External links
What Now official website
Mukpuddy Animation official website

New Zealand children's television series
2012 New Zealand television series debuts
TVNZ 2 original programming
2012 New Zealand television series endings